Church of Saint-Francis of Assisi is a Roman Catholic church situated in the village of Hervartov.

History
The church was constructed in wood at the end of 15th century. The wall paintings date between 1655 and 1805.

On July 7, 2008, the church along with seven other monuments was declared UNESCO world heritage site under the name "Wooden Churches of the Slovak part of the Carpathian Mountain Area".

References 

Wooden churches
World Heritage Sites in Slovakia
Wooden buildings and structures in Slovakia
15th-century Roman Catholic church buildings in Slovakia